Nine Letters to Berta is a 1966 Spanish drama film written and directed by Basilio Martín Patino which stars Mari Carrillo, Emilio Gutiérrez Caba, and Antonio Casas. It is widely acknowledged as a hallmark title of the so-called Nuevo Cine Español.

Plot 
In the 1950s, Lorenzo Carvajal, son to a former Francoist combatant now working in a bank and a pious housewife, returns to Salamanca from a spell in England. He writes love letters to a woman he met in England, Berta Carballeira (never featured onscreen), the daughter of a Spanish exile, also detailing the sense of weariness he experiences back in his native city, as he feels stranged from his family, local girlfriend, and friends.

Cast

Production 
The film is an Eco Films and Transcontinental Films Española (Transfisa) production. Shooting locations included Madrid and Salamanca.

Release 
The film was presented at the 14th San Sebastián International Film Festival in June 1966. It was released theatrically in Spain on 27 February 1967. 417,965 tickets were sold, with the film proving to be a blockbuster relative to comparable Nuevo Cine Español titles.

See also 
 List of Spanish films of 1967

References 

1960s Spanish-language films
1960s Spanish films
1966 drama films
1966 directorial debut films
Films set in Castile and León
Films shot in the province of Salamanca
Films shot in Madrid
Films set in the 1950s